Perrhybris pamela, the Pamela, is a butterfly of the family Pieridae. It is found from Mexico, Honduras, El Salvador, Costa Rica and Panama, south to Colombia, Venezuela, Suriname, French Guiana, Brazil, Ecuador, Peru, and Bolivia. This species breeds in lowland rainforest at altitudes between sea level and about 900 metres.

It is strongly sexually dichromatic, with the female resembling some species of Heliconiini.

Larvae have been recorded on Capparis isthmensis and Capparis pittieri.

Subspecies
P. p. pamela (Suriname)
P. p. eleidias (Brazil (Espírito Santo, São Paulo))
P. p. malenka (Venezuela)
P. p. alethina (Costa Rica, Panama)
P. p. flava
P. p. bogotana (Colombia)
P. p. amazonica (Peru)
P. p. glessaria (Ecuador)
P. p. carmenta (Peru, Bolivia)
P. p. incisa (Brazil (Bahia))
P. p. lucasi (French Guiana)
P. p. fruhstorferi (Panama)
P. p. boyi (Brazil (Amazonas))
P. p. chajulensis (Mexico, Honduras)
P. p. mapa (Mexico)
P. p. bertha (Peru)
P. p. mazuka (Peru)

There is also an undescribed subspecies from Costa Rica.

References

External links
 Butterflies of the Parque Nacional Sangay (Ecuador)

Pierini
Lepidoptera of French Guiana
Fauna of Brazil
Pieridae of South America
Taxa named by Caspar Stoll
Butterflies described in 1870
Butterflies of North America